The Hong Kong University of Science and Technology Students' Union (HKUSTSU)  is the students' union at The Hong Kong University of Science and Technology.

The union is an organisation registered with the Hong Kong Police Force under the Societies Ordinance (Cap. 151 of the Laws of Hong Kong), independent from the University but officially recognised by the university administration, other organisations include the Student Ambassador and HKUST International Students Association

History
The idea of a students' union representing all HKUST students was conceived as soon as the first ever cohort of HKUST students started school in 1991. The Hong Kong University of Science and Technology Students' Union was officially established a year later after lengthy preparation process.

Through a referendum staged in 2013, the union decided to affiliate itself to the Hong Kong Federation of Students, being the last university students' union to do so. The union remains one of the four member organisations of the federation, with no disaffiliation referendum being requisitioned during the 2015 disaffiliation movement in other universities.

Objectives
As delineated in the Constitution of the HKUSTSU, the union aims to:
 To promote social, culture, sporting and academic activities amongst members.
 To promote civic consciousness amongst members.
 To promote the welfare of members.
 To represent members in matters affecting their interest.
 To facilitate the development of the University.

Structure
The ultimate authority within the union is vested in resolutions passed by Referendums, whilst the second highest authority is the General Meeting.

The union consists of four independent statutory bodies, namely the Executive Committee, the Council, the Court, and the Editorial Board, which act as the executive, legislative, judicial branches and the press agency respectively.

Office-bearers for the Executive Committee and the Editorial Board, as well as Popularly Elected Councillors for the Council, are elected in the Annual Elections held every year in February. Councillors other than the ten popularly elected seats are returned by nomination of their respective representations, while judges of the Court would be appointed by the Council or a general meeting under the recommendation of the Judge Recommendation Committee.

Executive committee

The Executive Committee (幹事會) is the executive branch of the union, responsible for the day-to-day administration of the union. It also possesses the authority of representing all union members to participate in external affairs.

Headed by the President, the Vice-President (Internal) and Vice-President (External) of the union, eight standing committees are formed under the Executive Committee to take care of issues regarding the Union and its members, including:
Academic Affairs Committee
External Affairs Committee
Public Relations Committee
Publication Committee
Social Committee
Orientation Affairs Committee
University Affairs Committee
Welfare Committee

Council

The Council (評議會) acts as the legislature branch formed by representatives from different fields within the Union. There are a total of 34 seats to be filled by representatives of the Executive Committee, the Editorial Board, House Student Associations, Independent Clubs Association and Sports Association, Art and Cultural Clubs, school and departmental societies, as well as another 10 seats popularly elected by all union members.

It is responsible for legislation and regulation of finance and operations of Union, including the holding of all elections regarding the union; consideration and approval of applications for affiliation to the Union; supervision, advice, proposing and passing rules and regulations on all sub-organisations; interpretation of and proposing amendment to the Constitution of Union; as well as the consideration and approval of Master Budget of the Union and applications for Union subsidies.

To practice the above duties, the Council has five standing committees, namely the Affiliated Societies Committee, the Constitution Committee, the Council Administration Committee, the Election Committee and the Finance Committee.

Court

Chaired by the Chief Justice, The Court (仲裁會) is the judiciary body of HKUSTSU, responsible for settling disputes within the Union in a court setting arbitrated by judges. It also provides interpretation to the Constitution when need arises.

Editorial Board

Being the sole press agency within the university, The Editorial Board (編輯委員會) is responsible for maintaining WINGS (振翅) and WINGS High Fly Post (振翅之高飛報), the official publications of Union, providing chances for the free expressions of opinion among the student body.

It is responsible for the enrichment of students' awareness on university affairs, social issues and lifestyle, as well as the promotion of literary development within the university. The board also monitors the other organs of the union thru the pressure of public opinion.

The board consists of an Editor-in-Chief, two Assistant Editors-in-Chief, a Financial Controller, an Administrative Officer, a Marketing Officer as well as a number of Feature Editors and Designers.

Activities

Affiliated societies
There are over 100 affiliated societies of different interests and academic disciplines affiliated to the union, under control and supervision by the Union Council's Affiliated Societies Committee (ASC). Apart from the "sponsored student groups" sponsored by the university's Student Affairs Office (SAO), all student societies recognised by the university authority are affiliated under the Students' Union.

There are six types of affiliated societies in HKUST:
 Independent Clubs Association (ICA) and Independent Clubs – mainly interest clubs and often local chapters of inter-university or international organisations. Societies not falling into any of the following classifications shall be affiliated to ICA.
 Art and Cultural Clubs (ACC) – societies promoting art and cultural purposes.
 Sports Association (SA) and Sports Clubs
 House Associations – students' societies of the undergraduate student halls affiliated to the Students' Union. Such organisations, which exist in the five older undergraduate halls (UG Hall I-IV, PG Hall II), organise extra-curricular activities for their members so as to instil a sense of belonging and unity.
 Departmental Societies – most academic departments and programmes of study of the university have their own student societies. These societies would organise different activities to serve students of their corresponding departments.
 School Societies – societies representing students of the four schools and the Interdisciplinary Programs Office.

According to the Internal Regulations of the Union, all affiliated societies must bear ", HKUSTSU" as the suffix of their full name in English (while in Chinese, "香港科技大學學生會" must be added as the prefix). The suffix is omitted in the following list for the sake of clarity.

Services and outlets
The union operates a Print Shop at the university's LG5 Student Amenities, providing photocopying and printing service to the public. A Students' Union Co-op Shop is also operated by the union, selling stationery, snacks and electronic devices at a discounted price to union members.

Publications

Campaigning
After the 2014 Hong Kong protests, the union has been campaigning heavily for institutional autonomy. In March 2015, Andrew Liao was appointed as chairman of the Council, the supreme governing body of the HKUST, by Chief Executive CY Leung. As Liao was regarded as a keen supporter of Leung, the union issued a statement in opposition of the appointment on the grounds that it constituted alleged nepotism. In response to the union's statement, the government defended its decision as abiding by the rule of meritocracy.

In March 2016, three motions were put to referendum, calling for the abolition of the practice of HKSAR Chief Executive being the ex-officio university chancellor, the removal of Chief Executive's power of directly appointing University Council members, and the enhancement in the proportion of elected representatives from the student, faculty and alumni bodies, respectively. Submitted by the union executive committee, these motions were passed and became the official stance of the union.

References

External links
The Executive Committee, HKUSTSU
The Constitution of the HKUSTSU, 20th Edition
The Editorial Board, HKUSTSU
The Council, HKUSTSU
The Court, HKUSTSU

Students' Union
Students' unions in Hong Kong
1992 establishments in Hong Kong
Student organizations established in 1992